The Yaquina Formation is a geologic formation in Oregon. It preserves fossils dating back to the Paleogene period.

Fossil content

Mammals

Carnivorans

Cetaceans

Desmostylians

Fish

Bony fish

Sharks

See also

 List of fossiliferous stratigraphic units in Oregon
 Paleontology in Oregon

References

Sources
 

Paleogene geology of Oregon
Formations